Task Force Bangon Marawi is a government inter-agency task force group organized to facilitate the rehabilitation, recovery and reconstruction efforts in Marawi after the battle between ISIL-linked militants and government forces in the city left the locality in ruins.

History

The Marawi crisis which saw government forces and combined forces of the ISIL-linked Maute and Abu Sayyaf groups left the city in ruins.

President Rodrigo Duterte through Administrative Order no. 3 dated June 28, 2017 created the Task Force Bangon Marawi to facilitate the rehabilitation, recovery and reconstruction efforts in Marawi. At that time the conflict is still ongoing. Task Force Bangon Marawi is an inter-agency task force with its members affiliated to several executive departments. The creation of the task force was made known to the media on July 3, 2017.

Administrative Order no. 9 dated October 27, 2017 designated the Chairman of the Housing and Urban Development Coordinating Council as the chairperson of the task force replacing the Secretary of National Defense who became the vice-chairman along with the Secretary of Public Works and Highways.

Composition
Heads
Chairperson: Eduardo del Rosario (Housing and Urban Development Coordinating Council)
Vice Chairpersons: Delfin Lorenzana (Department of National Defense) and Mark Villar (Department of Public Works and Highways)

Members
Chairman of the Joint Chiefs of the Armed Forces of the Philippines
Department of Education Secretary
Department of Health Secretary
Department of Energy Secretary
Department of Budget and Management Secretary
Department of Social Welfare and Development Secretary
Department of the Interior and Local Government Secretary
Department of Information and Communications Technology Secretary
Department of Science and Technology Secretary
Department of Trade and Industry Secretary
Department of Transportation Secretary
Chairperson of the Local Water Utilities Administration
Chairperson of the Mindanao Development Authority
Chairperson of the National Electrification Administration
General Manager of the National Housing Authority (Philippines)
Cabinet Secretary
Director-General of the National Economic and Development Authority
Director-General of the Technical Education and Skills Development Authority
Administrator of the Office of Civil Defense
Chief of the Philippine National Police
Representative from the Office of the President

Source:

References

Marawi
Government agencies of the Philippines
2017 establishments in the Philippines
History of Lanao del Sur